Kohhran Thianghlim (The Holy Church) is a Christian denomination in Mizoram, northeast India. It was founded by Dr L.B. Sailo (Lalbiakmawia Sailo) in 1984. The founder is a certified veterinary doctor working as the Director of Animal Husbandry and Veterinary Department, Government of Mizoram. It is headquartered in Aizawl at Chawlhhmun, where its Solomon's Temple is located. It is administered by the Executive Committee, which has subordinate boards to manage sectional activities. It is spread all over Mizoram with seven administrative divisions. It uses David's star as insignia on its flag, emblem and Temple.

Administration 

Aizawl is the general headquarters of the church and a seat of Executive Committee that is the highest body in spiritual and administrative matters. It is portrayed as spiritual Jerusalem for the elects (members of the church).

Midnight Herald 

The church publishes its bulletin Midnight Herald (Zanlai Au Aw). It is an evangelical fortnightly published in Mizo since 20 September 1998. It was registered on 21 June 2011 with the Registrar of Newspaper in India, RNI regn. No. MIZMIZ/2009/37924.

Phileo 

It is the church official bulletin circulated weekly within the church domain. The publication was started on 1992.

Solomon’s Temple 

The church is constructing Solomon's Temple, Aizawl Mizoram, India at Kidron Valley, Chawlhhmun. Construction began on 11 January 1995, foundation stone laid on 23 December 1996 and works are taken up by Building Advisory Board. For its afforestation of Temple premise, the church was awarded Green Mizoram outstanding performance by the Government of Mizoram in 1999 and 2000. An annual convention named Jerusalem Khawmpui is held every year at the Temple in the last week of December.' Elects from different places gather for worshiping the Almighty God and as pilgrimage.

Books 

Publication Board of the church has published 14 books written in Mizo by Dr L.B. Sailo, and one book in English (Sl.No.-5 Mystery of Elects). The lists of books published along with the years of edition are:

Kraws leh Thlarau Thianghlim - 1983 
Pathian Mihringa a Inpuanna Tluantling (Thlarauva Thawhlehna Ram) - 1984 
Pathian Chatuan Thil Tum (Thlante Thuruk) - 1985, 1986, 1987, 1992 and 2004 
Moneitu Au Aw (Thlante Thuruk) 1988, 1989 and 1992	
The Mystery of Elects -1989
Khawngaihna Thutak (Kraws Thuruk)- 1990 and 1991
Lunghlu Kawngkhar Mawi (Kraws Thuruk) - 1992 
Harh A Hun Ta ! (Booklet) - 1993 	
Chhandamna Lawng (Thlante Thuruk) - 1993 and 2010
Lal Isua : A Lo Kal Lehna  - 1994 and 2011
Tunlai Khawvel leh Kristianna - 1994 and 1995
Kraws Daihlim (Testimony) - 1995 	
Kraws Daihlim (Thlante Thuruk) – 2005 and 2006
Nunna Tui Lui (Kraws Thuruk) - 2009

Publication Board of the Church is now a full-fledged publishing agency/firm registered under the International Standard Book Number (ISBN) Agency, United House, North Road, London, United Kingdom. It has recently been allotted Publisher's identifier under the ISBN system in category 5 (religious literature). (Ref.: Category 5/2014-ISBN, Dated 10.02.2014)

Missionary 

The church sends missionaries to different parts of Mizoram. The first batch of missionaries were officially anointed in 1995. They also act as officials/ministers during church official functions and sometimes as a shepherd for the members.

Secretariat 

It is located in Chawlhhmun, Aizawl.  Superintendent is the head of administration and is the drawing and disbursing officer as well. All other functionaries like cashier, clerk, assistant, etc. work under his supervision. Church offset press runs in the same building. It is the headquarters of the Church's administration.

Flag 

The official flag of the church is divided diagonally from the lower hoist corner to upper fly corner by a broad black band bearing seven white David's stars; the black band is edged in red stripe at the upper portion, blue stripe at the lower portion; the upper hoist-side triangle is sky-blue with a white cross imposed on it; the lower triangle is red.

See also
 List of Christian denominations in North East India

References

Aizawl
Christianity in Mizoram
Churches in Mizoram
Christian denominations in India
1984 establishments in Manipur
Christian organizations established in 1984